Lara Wendel (born Daniela Barnes; 29 March 1965) is a German former actress who was active in Italian cinema and television.

Life and career 
Wendel is the daughter of German actress Britta Wendel and of the American football player and film actor Walt Barnes. She made her debut at just four years old as a model for ads, and at the age of seven she made her film debut in the Tonino Valerii's giallo film My Dear Killer (1972). She also appeared as Mario Adorf's daughter Rita in Manhunt (1972), directed by Fernando Di Leo, and as the young Silvia in The Perfume of the Lady in Black (1974), directed by Francesco Barilli.

Wendel had her first main role at 12 years old in the controversial erotic drama Maladolescenza (1977), which involved both nudity and simulated sex among preadolescents.

In the 1980s Wendel was mainly active in horror films, working with Dario Argento (Tenebrae, 1982), Lamberto Bava (Midnight Killer, 1986), Joe D'Amato (Killing Birds, 1988), and Umberto Lenzi (Ghosthouse, 1988) among others. She was also in a number of art films, including Michelangelo Antonioni's Identification of a Woman (1982) and Federico Fellini's Intervista (1987).  She also appeared on television, notably playing a starring role in the second season of the TV-series La piovra. Her last film was Mauro Bolognini's erotic drama Husband and Lovers (1991), and she retired at just 26 years old.

Filmography

References

External links 

Actresses from Munich
German film actresses
German television actresses
German child actresses
1965 births
20th-century German actresses
Living people
German emigrants to Italy
German people of American descent